The Ocilla Public School, also known as Irwin County Elementary School, is a historic school building in Ocilla, Georgia, United States, that is listed on the National Register of Historic Places.

Description
The main building is a one-story U-shaped building with 17 classrooms, a library, a 700-seat auditorium, and more.  It has Colonial Revival details.  It was built in 1934 to serve as both elementary school and high school.  In the early 1950s, it became known as the Irwin County Elementary School when a separate high school was built about three blocks away.

A one-story brick cafeteria and classroom building was added in c.1960, and has International Style design.

See also

 National Register of Historic Places listings in Irwin County, Georgia

References

External links

School buildings on the National Register of Historic Places in Georgia (U.S. state)
Colonial Revival architecture in Georgia (U.S. state)
International style architecture in Georgia (U.S. state)
School buildings completed in 1934
National Register of Historic Places in Irwin County, Georgia
1934 establishments in Georgia (U.S. state)